Burwood Park is an historic private estate located in Hersham, Surrey, England. Spanning six miles of road, Burwood Park is situated in a former deer park that belonged to Henry VIII. The 360 acre estate is known both for its extensive wildlife — more than 150 species of birds and mammals have been recorded in the woods and parkland around its lakes and communal areas —.as well as the high level of security and privacy provided to its residents; it is one of the few remaining residential areas in the United Kingdom never to have been filmed by Google Streetview.

Acquired by Henry Askew in 1877, the first new houses in Burwood Park were constructed in the 1920s, with major new developments arriving in the following decade. It soon became a popular destination for the British elite, owing to its semi-rural feel and commutable distance to London.

Comprising 384 properties by 2021, Burwood Park is of a geometric design within an approximate semicircle and many of its roads have entrances with automatic bollards or security buildings.

History
King Henry VIII purchased what is now Burwood Park from John Carleton in 1540. He ordered Burwood as with the Ashley and Oatlands manors to be converted to a deer park or woodland for him to enjoy.

Between 1617 and 1720, Burwood Park passed through a succession of purchasers and their heirs. John Latton, a Deputy Lieutenant of Surrey under Queen Anne, purchased the main house in 1720. He enlarged Burwood from its own demise of 18 acres, to its present extent  by buying up part of Walton Common, glebe around the perimeter and the little hamlet of Burwood with its windmill (later damaged and taken down in 1797) which was on the site of the house Webbers' Ridge in Cranley Road.

In 1739 the first of the Frederick baronets acquired it – Burwood Park mansion in land west of the former Burwood House (manor house) was built by Sir John Frederick (1708–1783), a wealthy city merchant and Lord Mayor of London. He planted many of the trees and shrubs, which are a feature of the woodlands, having collected a number of aesthetically pleasing and unusual species. Some he retained such as the wide oak tree in Eriswell Road the width of which indicates it was a sapling in 1600 or earlier.  He did convert gravel works for his buildings' construction into the present ornamental lakes. These drained into Black Pond in the plot of Lynwood in Eastwick Road, thence to the War Memorial Pond (removed during the late 20th century) in Hersham, thence to the River Mole.

The second Frederick baronet, Sir John (1749–1825), lived in the mansion, as did the sixth, Sir Richard. To the north across the present roundabout and entirely at road level is a rebuilt bridge across the long, deep cutting of the South West Main Line, name-plaqued Sir Richard's Bridge, having agreed to it with the railway to enable his pony and traps and visitors to access his estate directly from the direction of Walton & Hersham station (today simplified to 'Walton on Thames') which opened in May 1838. He died in 1863.

Henry Askew of Westmorland purchased it from the family. Two of his three daughters (imposing many of the later covenants) arranged for a black painted corrugated iron fence to be erected all around the Park and lived in the mansion as virtual recluses.

After the deaths of the Askew daughters, an estate company first purchased and then sold the park to Edward Guinness, 1st Earl of Iveagh (1847–1927) in the year in which he died. Rupert Guinness his son divided most of the park, barring tree-lined roads and verges, into large-garden plots with a great minimum value of any home to be built in each, in 1934, laying out the private roads. He was the first Chairman of the Burhill Estates Company formed for this purpose and named roads after Guinness family estates in Suffolk.

Houses such as The Beeches had been built by the late 1920s, but the first major housing development was in 1934 in Onslow Road. The mansion in Burwood Park was converted into a girls' school. Vacated during the Second World War, it was converted to educate forty boys and girls who were born deaf. A new sixth form college was opened in 1975. The school was the only Secondary Technical School for deaf boys and girls in England and was sponsored by the Guinness family. The school eventually closed, and in 1999, Octagon Developments were commissioned to re-convert the Grade II* listed building into a dwelling and to build seven further individual houses in the grounds.

Profile
Burwood Park is one of a number of private gated estates in Surrey, among them the Wentworth Estate and St. George's Hill, known for social exclusivity and high-net-worth residents. House prices in Burwood Park typically start from around £2m and have been stimulated in recent years because of an ongoing trend for wealthy homeowners to sell London property and decamp to Surrey. Burwood Park, along with neighbouring Ashley Park, have been described as "the most exclusive addresses" in the Walton-on-Thames area.

In 2013, two streets on the estate, Broadwater Close and Chargate Close, were revealed to be among the most expensive places in the country to buy property.

Location and transport
Burwood Park is in the borough of Elmbridge, Surrey, and is bordered by a public road to its west, with Hersham to the immediate east, and by Burhill Golf Course to the south. The Ashley Park estate lies to the north of Burwood Park.

Within ⅓ miles (500 metres) is Walton-on-Thames railway station which offers fast (non-stopping) service trains to London Waterloo, Basingstoke, Woking and Surbiton. The feasibility of quick commuting is part of the appeal of the wider area. Burwood Park in particular is known to be "well-connected" yet also offer a sense of seclusion to its residents.

Plant and animal species
Over 150 species of birds and animals have been spotted within the boundaries of the estate, which also contains one of England's oldest oak trees. Residents have reported the occasional deer grazing in their gardens.  Burwood Park Residents Limited was set up in 1991 to protect the park's environment and to look after members' interests.

A wildlife coordinator, a role taken up by an estate resident, is charged with the welfare of animals, both wild and domestic.

References

External links
Burwood Park website

Borough of Elmbridge
Gated communities in the United Kingdom